The Hessian Ministry of Economics, Energy, Transport and Housing, abbreviated HMWEVW, is a state institution of the German State of Hesse. It has its headquarters in the state capital of Wiesbaden.

The offices for roads and transport are for the planning, construction and expansion and maintenance of federal highways, federal and state roads and have regional responsibility and jurisdiction over some of the planning of county and township roads on behalf of counties and municipalities .
The Ministry is responsible for the planning approval of federal roads and highways. Further responsibilities include land planning and village renewal, and awarding the Rheingau Literatur Preis.

External links 
 Hessisches Ministerium für Wirtschaft, Energie, Verkehr und Wohnen
 EFRE in Hessen

Government of Hesse
Organisations based in Wiesbaden
Hesse
Hesse
Hesse
Hesse